Liu Xuqing (born August 15, 1968) is a female Chinese softball player. She competed in the 1996 Summer Olympics.

In 1996, she won the silver medal as part of the Chinese team. She played all ten matches.

External links
Liu Xuqing's profile

1968 births
Living people
Chinese softball players
Olympic silver medalists for China
Olympic softball players of China
Softball players at the 1996 Summer Olympics
Olympic medalists in softball
Medalists at the 1996 Summer Olympics
Asian Games medalists in softball
Softball players at the 1990 Asian Games
Softball players at the 1994 Asian Games
Medalists at the 1990 Asian Games
Medalists at the 1994 Asian Games
Asian Games gold medalists for China